1917 is a 1970 British short film directed by Stephen Weeks and starring Timothy Bateson, David Leland, and Geoffrey Davies.

References

External links

1917 at BFI

1970 films
British short films
1970s English-language films